A Little More Faith is an album by blues musician Reverend Gary Davis released on the Bluesville label in September 1961.

Reception

AllMusic reviewer Bruce Eder stated: "it's a masterpiece: its dozen songs recorded on one day in August of 1961 are nothing less than priceless. Davis presents an easy virtuosity on his solo guitar, and runs his voice across a surprisingly wide range in what is mostly gospel repertory. Not that any blues fans will mind his approach: Davis was one of those figures where the sound and feel of blues becomes indistinguishable from those of gospel. He was just doing what came naturally on this record, laying down 12 songs he knew well from across decades of performing".

Track listing
All compositions by Gary Davis except where noted
 "You Got to Move" (Traditional) – 3:19
 "Crucifixion" – 4:57
 "I'm Glad I'm in That Number" – 2:58
 "There's a Table Sittin' in Heaven" – 3:28
 "Motherless Children" (Traditional) – 4:12
 "There's a Bright Side Somewhere" (Traditional) – 3:12
 "I'll Be All Right Some Day" – 3:03
 "You Better Mind" – 3:26
 "A Little More Faith" – 3:40
 "I'll Fly Away" (Albert E. Brumley) – 4:32
 "God's Gonna Separate" (Traditional) – 3:35
 "When I Die I'll Live Again" – 3:28

Personnel

Performance
Blind Gary Davis – guitar, vocals

Production
 Kenneth S. Goldstein – supervision
 Rudy Van Gelder – engineer

References

Reverend Gary Davis albums
1961 albums
Bluesville Records albums
Albums recorded at Van Gelder Studio